Shojaat Ghane (born 1975) is an Iranian chess grandmaster (2008).

Life
Ghane started playing chess when he was 16. He is a student of physical education.

References

Iranian chess players
Chess grandmasters
1975 births
Living people